Nigeria Airways was founded on 23 August 1958. It succeeded the folded West African Airways Corporation (WAAC), and was initially named WAAC Nigeria. The company took over the WAAC assets and liabilities and started operations on 1 October 1958. In association with Pan American Airways (PAA), the Lagos–New York City route was opened in October 1964 using PAA's DC-8 and Boeing 707 aircraft.

WAAC Nigeria changed its name to Nigeria Airways in 1971. The carrier was wholly owned by the Government of Nigeria for almost its entire life. The airline ceased operations in 2003.

List
Following is a list of destinations Nigeria Airways flew to all through its history as part of its scheduled services. The list includes the name of each city served, the country name, and the name of the airport served along with both its associated International Air Transport Association three-letter code (IATA airport code) and the International Civil Aviation Organization four-letter code (ICAO airport code). Airline hubs and focus cities, as well as destinations served at the time of closure, are also marked.

References 



Nigeria Airways
Defunct airlines of Nigeria